Lac-Etchemin is a municipality in and the seat of the Municipalité régionale de comté des Etchemins in Quebec, Canada. It is part of the Chaudière-Appalaches region and the population is 4,028 as of 2021. It takes its name from Etchemin Lake, at the centre of the municipality. "Etchemin" means "men, human beings" in Abenaki language.

Lac-Etchemin is home to winter resort Mont Orignal and the birthplace of controversial religious Community of the Lady of All Nations.

History

The area near Etchemin Lake was first described in 1828 as lovely by the surveyor Emmanuel.

The new municipality of Lac-Etchemin was created in 2001 following the amalgamation of the city of Lac-Etchemin and the parish of Sainte-Germaine-du-Lac-Etchemin.

People linked to Lac-Etchemin
 Joseph-Damase Bégin, Quebec politician
 Denis Bernard, actor and producer
 Marie-Michèle Gagnon, World Cup alpine ski racer

See also
 Etchemin Lake, a water body
 Etchemin River, a stream
 Discharge of Etchemin Lake, a stream
 Little Etchemin River, a stream
 Raquette River (Famine River), a stream
 Flowers River, a stream
 Daaquam River, a stream
 Liste of cities in Chaudière-Appalaches
 List of municipalities in Quebec

References

Commission de toponymie du Québec
Ministère des Affaires municipales, des Régions et de l'Occupation du territoire

External links
  Lac-Etchemin official website

Municipalities in Quebec
Incorporated places in Chaudière-Appalaches